The 2013 season was Negeri Sembilan's 8th season in Malaysia Super League since it was first introduced in 2004, the top flight of Malaysian football. The club finished 12th in the table and were relegated to the Malaysia Premier League.

Review

Pre-season
Negeri Sembilan put eight new faces including two import players to cover Hoben Jang Hoben squad challenges in Super League 2013 season. Two import players are striker from Argentina, Emanuel De Porras and defender of Cameroon, William Paul Modibo offered a year contract as the latest backup squad Jangs in forming a strong team and the caliber of providing high quality performances for them to compete in the league . 8 new faces in squad of the 2013 season are Mohd Hamsani Ahmad, Abdul Ghani Rahman and S. Sivanesan (Felda United), Mohd Fauzi Nan (Kedah), Azmeer Yusof (Pos Malaysia), Eddy Helmi Abdul Manan (Johor FC), Mohd Alafi Mahmud (MP Muar) and Mohd Radzuan Abdullah promote from Negeri Sembilan President's. Players who remain with squad are Kaharuddin, Badrulzaman, Tengku Qayyum, Norhafiz Zamani, Mohd Zulfaizham Kamis, Rashid Mamud, Muszaki, Mohd Alif, Norismaidham, Shahurain, Idris Karim, Halim Zainal, Mohd Nazrin Mohd Nawi, Mohd Firdaus Azizul, Shakir Ali. While the 9 pillars of migratory jangs is Qhairul Anwar and Effa Owona choose not to renew the contract and join Terengganu, Farizal Marlias migrated to Perak, Shukor Adan to ATM, S. Kunanlan to Selangor, G. Mahathevan to T-Team Titans and PBNS release defender from Czechoslovakia, Marian Farbák, Vijayan Parameswaran and Mohd Shaffik Abdul Rahman.
Source: BERNAMA

Club

Coaching Staff

Other information

Kit Manufacturers & Financial Sponsor

Players

Full squad

Transfers

Disember

In

Out

April

In

Out

Non-competitive

Pre-season

Friendly Match

Competitions

Malaysia Super League

Matches

Malaysia FA Cup

Knockout stage

Quarter-finals

Terengganu FA won 6–1 on aggregate and advanced to the Semi-finals.

Malaysia Cup

Play-off

Group stage

Season statistics

Top scorers

Disciplinary record 

 = Number of bookings;  = Number of sending offs after a second yellow card;  = Number of sending offs by a direct red card.

References 

Negeri Sembilan FA seasons
Negeri Sembilan